Cyclostremiscus is a genus of small sea snails in the family Tornidae.

Taxonomy
Rolán & Rubio (2002: 46) hold Discopsis as a valid genus, distinct from Cochliolepis Stimpson, 1858, on the grounds that the latter belongs in the family Vitrinellidae and the former in Tornidae. This should be reevaluated in the perspective that both families are considered synonyms. Adam & Knudsen (1969) may have been right in placing the West African species in Cochliolepis.

Species
Species within the genus Cyclostremiscus include:
 
 Cyclostremiscus adamsi Pilsbry & Olsson, 1945
 Cyclostremiscus albachiarae Perugia, 2015
 Cyclostremiscus anceps (Laws, 1941) †
 Cyclostremiscus anxius (Hedley, 1909)
 Cyclostremiscus azuerensis Pilsbry & Olsson, 1952
 Cyclostremiscus bailyi (Hertlein & A. M. Strong, 1951)
 Cyclostremiscus balboa Pilsbry & Olsson, 1945
 Cyclostremiscus baldridgae (Bartsch, 1911)
 Cyclostremiscus bartschi (Mansfield, 1936)
 Cyclostremiscus beauii (P. Fischer, 1857)
 Cyclostremiscus bifrontia (Carpenter, 1857)
 Cyclostremiscus calameli (Jousseaume, 1872)
 Cyclostremiscus cerrosensis (Bartsch, 1907)
 Cyclostremiscus colombianus Pilsbry & Olsson, 1945
 Cyclostremiscus coronatus (Carpenter, 1857)
 Cyclostremiscus cubanus (Pilsbry & Aguayo, 1933)
 Cyclostremiscus dalli (Bush, 1897)
 Cyclostremiscus diminutus Rubio, Rolán & Pelorce, 2011
 Cyclostremiscus diomedeae (Bartsch, 1911)
 Cyclostremiscus euglyptus Aguayo & Borro, 1946
 Cyclostremiscus exigua (C. B. Adams, 1852)
 Cyclostremiscus gallo Pilsbry & Olsson, 1945
 Cyclostremiscus glyptobasis Pilsbry & Olsson, 1952 †
 Cyclostremiscus glyptomphalus Pilsbry & Olsson, 1952 †
 Cyclostremiscus gordanus (Hertlein & A. M. Strong, 1951)
 Cyclostremiscus hendersoni (Dall, 1927)
 Cyclostremiscus janus (C. B. Adams, 1852)
 Cyclostremiscus jeannae Pilsbry & McGinty, 1946
 Cyclostremiscus lirulatus (Carpenter, 1857)
 Cyclostremiscus lowei (F. Baker, Hanna & A. M. Strong, 1938)
 Cyclostremiscus madreensis (F. Baker, Hanna & A. M. Strong, 1938)
 Cyclostremiscus major Olsson & M. Smith, 1952
 Cyclostremiscus microstriatus Rubio, Rolán & H. G. Lee, 2011
 Cyclostremiscus mohicanus Simone, 2012
 Cyclostremiscus multiliratus Rubio, Rolán & Garcia, 2011
 Cyclostremiscus nodiferus Pilsbry & Olsson, 1952
 Cyclostremiscus nodosus (Carpenter, 1857)
 Cyclostremiscus nummus Pilsbry & Olsson, 1952
 Cyclostremiscus pachynepion Pilsbry & Olsson, 1945
 Cyclostremiscus panamensis (C. B. Adams, 1852)
 Cyclostremiscus parvus (C. B. Adams, 1852)
 Cyclostremiscus pauli Pilsbry & Olsson, 1952
 Cyclostremiscus pentagonus (Gabb, 1873)
 Cyclostremiscus perparvus (C. B. Adams, 1852)
 Cyclostremiscus peruvianus Pilsbry & Olsson, 1945
 Cyclostremiscus planospira Pilsbry & Olsson, 1945
 Cyclostremiscus planospiratus (Carpenter, 1857)
 Cyclostremiscus psix Pilsbry & Olsson, 1952
 Cyclostremiscus spiceri (F. Baker, Hanna & A. M. Strong, 1938)
 Cyclostremiscus spiritualis (F. Baker, Hanna & A. M. Strong, 1938)
 Cyclostremiscus suppressus (Dall, 1889)
 Cyclostremiscus taigai (Hertlein & A. M. Strong, 1951)
 Cyclostremiscus tenuisculptus (Carpenter, 1864)
 Cyclostremiscus tricarinatus (C. B. Adams, 1852)
 Cyclostremiscus trigonatus (Carpenter, 1857)
 Cyclostremiscus trilix (Bush, 1885)
 Cyclostremiscus unicornis (Pilsbry & Olsson, 1945)
 Cyclostremiscus valvatoides (C. B. Adams, 1852)
 Cyclostremiscus vanbruggeni De Jong & Coomans, 1988
 Cyclostremiscus veleronis (A. M. Strong & Hertlein, 1947)
 Cyclostremiscus verreauxii (P. Fischer, 1857)
 Cyclostremiscus xantusi (Bartsch, 1907)l end

Species brought into synonymy
 Cyclostremiscus anxium [sic] : synonym of Cyclostremiscus anxius (Hedley, 1909) (incorrect gender ending)
 Cyclostremiscus baldridgei [sic] : synonym of Cyclostremiscus baldridgae (Bartsch, 1911) (misspelling)
 Cyclostremiscus bartschi Pilsbry & Olsson, 1945 : synonym of Cyclostremiscus pauli Pilsbry & Olsson, 1952 (invalid: junior homonym of Cyclostremiscus bartschi Hertlein & Strong, 1939; C. pauli is a replacement name)
 Cyclostremiscus bartschi A. M. Strong & Hertlein, 1939 : synonym of Cyclostremiscus veleronis (A. M. Strong & Hertlein, 1947) (secondary homonym of Cyclostrema bartschi Mansfield, 1936; C. veleronis is a replacement name)
 Cyclostremiscus bermudezi Aguayo & Borro, 1946 : synonym of Orbitestella bermudezi (Aguayo & Borro, 1946)
 Cyclostremiscus caraboboensis Weisbord, 1962 : synonym of Tornus caraboboensis (Weisbord, 1962) (original combination)
 Cyclostremiscus cosmius (Bartsch, 1907) : synonym of Circulus cosmius Bartsch, 1907
 Cyclostremiscus crassilabris Aguayo & Borro, 1946 : synonym of Anticlimax crassilabris (Aguayo & Borro, 1946) (original combination)
 Cyclostremiscus dariae Liuzzi & Zucchi Stolfa, 1979 : synonym of Orbitestella dariae (Liuzzi & Zucchi Stolfa, 1979)
 Cyclostremiscus emeryi Ladd, 1966 : synonym of Lodderena emeryi (Ladd, 1966)
 Cyclostremiscus novemcarinatus (Melvill, 1906) : synonym of Lodderia novemcarinata (Melvill, 1906) : synonym of Circulus novemcarinatus (Melvill, 1906)
 Cyclostremiscus ornatus Olsson & McGinty, 1958 : synonym of Lodderena ornata (Olsson & McGinty, 1958) (original combination)
 Cyclostremiscus pulchellus Olsson & McGinty, 1958 : synonym of Lodderena pulchella (Olsson & McGinty, 1958) (original combination)
 Cyclostremiscus schrammii (P. Fischer, 1857) : synonym of Tornus schrammii (P. Fischer, 1857)
 Cyclostremiscus solitarius Hertlein & Allison, 1968 : synonym of Lodderena ornata (Olsson & McGinty, 1958)
 Cyclostremiscus striatus Kay, 1979 : synonym of Lodderena striata (Kay, 1979) (original combination)

References

 Spencer, H.G., Marshall, B.A. & Willan, R.C. (2009). Checklist of New Zealand living Mollusca. Pp 196-219. in: Gordon, D.P. (ed.) New Zealand inventory of biodiversity. Volume one. Kingdom Animalia: Radiata, Lophotrochozoa, Deuterostomia. Canterbury University Press, Christchurch
 Rubio, F.; Fernández-Garcés, R.; Rolán, E. (2011). The family Tornidae (Gastropoda, Rissooidea) in the Caribbean and neighboring areas. Iberus. 29(2), 1-230

Tornidae